Jug is an album by saxophonist Gene Ammons recorded in 1961 and released on the Prestige label.

Reception
The AllMusic review by Scott Yanow stated: "Jug finds the great tenor in excellent form... Few surprises occur, but fans will not be disappointed by his soulful and lyrical playing".

Track listing 
All compositions by Gene Ammons, except as indicated
 "Ol' Man River" (Oscar Hammerstein II, Jerome Kern) - 5:11     
 "Easy to Love" (Cole Porter) - 4:14     
 "Seed Shack" - 5:39     
 "Let It Be You" (Clarence Anderson) - 3:48     
 "Exactly Like You" (Dorothy Fields, Jimmy McHugh) - 5:59     
 "Miss Lucy" - 3:42     
 "Namely You" (Gene DePaul, Johnny Mercer) - 4:45     
 "Tangerine" (Mercer, Victor Schertzinger) - 3:36

Personnel 
Gene Ammons - tenor saxophone
Richard Wyands - piano (tracks 1-4, 7 & 8)
Clarence "Sleepy" Anderson - organ, piano (track 5 & 6)
Doug Watkins - bass
J.C. Heard - drums
Ray Barretto - conga drum

References 

Gene Ammons albums
1961 albums
Prestige Records albums
Albums recorded at Van Gelder Studio
Albums produced by Esmond Edwards